Allan Hopkins (24 May 1904 –  2 July 2001) was an Australian rules footballer in the (then) Victorian Football League.

Football
He started off his career with Footscray Football Club before they joined the Victorian Football League (VFL) in 1925. He had played in the club's 1923 and 1924 premiership sides in the Victorian Football Association (VFA).

A brilliant centreman, he was awarded the Brownlow Medal retrospectively in 1989 for the 1930 season while playing with the Footscray Bulldogs, and won the Bulldogs' best and fairest in 1931.

He went on to win the VFA premiership with Yarraville Football Club in 1935 as captain-coach.

References

External links

 
 AFL Hall of Fame

1904 births
2001 deaths
Australian rules footballers from Melbourne
Australian Rules footballers: place kick exponents
Australian Football Hall of Fame inductees
Brownlow Medal winners
Western Bulldogs players
Western Bulldogs coaches
Yarraville Football Club players
Yarraville Football Club coaches
Footscray Football Club (VFA) players
Charles Sutton Medal winners

Place of birth missing
People from Footscray, Victoria